HD 203473 is a star in the equatorial constellation Equuleus. With an apparent magnitude of 8.23, it’s only visible by using an amateur telescope. The star is located at a distance of 237 light years based on its parallax shift but is drifting closer at a high rate of 61.7 km/s. As of 2014, no stellar companions have been detected around the star.

HD 203473 is an ordinary G-type main-sequence star with 82% the mass of the Sun, but is 48% larger than the latter. This star is over luminous and hot for its class, with it radiating at 2.31 the luminosity of the Sun and an effective temperature of 5,847 K. HD 203473 has different age estimates, either being 5 or 8 billion years old. The higher luminosity and low projected rotational velocity of 1 km/s favors the older age estimate. Like many planetary hosts, HD 203473 has an enhanced metallicity, with an iron abundance 1.51 times that of the Sun.

Companion
In 2018, the N2K project discovered an object, initially thought to be a planet, orbiting the star via Doppler spectroscopy. Due to the detection method, its inclination and true mass were initially unknown. In 2022, the inclination and true mass of this companion were measured via astrometry, revealing it to be  and thus either a massive brown dwarf or low-mass star. The companion's orbital period was also found to be twice as long as originally thought.

References

Equuleus
G-type main-sequence stars
105521
203473
Planetary systems with one confirmed planet
Durchmusterung objects